There were elections in 1971 to the United States House of Representatives:

 
1971